Yu Sun-bok (Hangul: 유순복; born August 2, 1970) is a former table tennis player from North Korea who competed in the 1992 Summer Olympics.

References

External links

1970 births
Living people
North Korean female table tennis players
Table tennis players at the 1992 Summer Olympics
Olympic table tennis players of North Korea
Olympic bronze medalists for North Korea
Olympic medalists in table tennis
Medalists at the 1992 Summer Olympics
Asian Games medalists in table tennis
Table tennis players at the 1990 Asian Games
Asian Games bronze medalists for North Korea
Medalists at the 1990 Asian Games
20th-century North Korean women